This is a list of notable people from Monterrey, Mexico.

Notable people 
Jesus Arellano, footballer for local squad Rayados de Monterrey and formerly of the Mexican national side
Bárbara López, Mexican actress
Eva Gonda de Rivera, Mexican billionaire heiress and businesswoman
David Martínez, Mexican investor, businessman, the founder and managing partner of Fintech Advisory
Marcela Bovio, lead singer of Stream of Passion
Erika Buenfil, actress
Fernando Canales, businessman, and Mexican politician
Federico Cantú, painter, engraver and sculptor, also known as El Ulises de Cadereyta
Eloy Cavazos, bullfighter
Jorge de la Rosa, MLB player for the Milwaukee Brewers, Kansas City Royals, and the Colorado Rockies
Aldo de Nigris, association footballer
Antonio de Nigris, association footballer
Giovani dos Santos, association footballer
Mario Vanzzini , Tv host and Showrunner 
Jonathan dos Santos, association footballer
Cynthia Duque, Miss Mexico Universe 2013
Fernando Elizondo, politician
Ernesto Enkerlin Hoeflich, conservationist
Anagabriela Espinoza, TV hostess, model and Miss International 2009
Mauricio Fernandez Garza, businessman, politician and millionaire
Katty Fuentes, Miss Mexico Universe 1998
Elsa García, artistic gymnast
Eugenio Garza Lagüera, businessman
Eugenio Garza Sada, businessman and philanthropist
María Luisa "Loreley" Garza, writer, intellectual, poet and essayist, also known as La novia de Nervo
José Eleuterio González, medical doctor and professor
Fabiola Guajardo, actress, model, author and musician
Ely Guerra, singer-songwriter
Esteban Gutiérrez, Formula 1 driver for Sauber
Malukah, singer-songwriter
Lucero Montemayor, Miss Mexico International 2013
Bianca Marroquin, musical theatre actress known as the first Latina to play in a starring role on Broadway
José Marroquín Leal, clown and children's TV show host
Eduardo Martínez Celis, journalist, author and politician, also known as El Abate Sieyés
Servando Teresa de Mier, Roman Catholic priest
Consuelo Morales Elizondo, human rights activist
José A. Muguerza, businessman and philanthropist
Pato O'Ward, racing driver competing for Arrow McLaren SP in the IndyCar Series
Ramiro Peña, Major League Baseball player
Priscila Perales, actress, model and Miss International 2007
Celso Piña, singer-songwriter
Alejandra Quintero, Model and Miss Mexico World 1995
Adal Ramones, comedian, television host
Nayeli Rangel, captain of the Mexico women's national football team
Alfonso Reyes, writer, intellectual, poet and essayist, also known as El Regiomontano Universal
Sofía Reyes, actress and singer-songwriter
Silvia Salgado, Miss Mexico Universe 1999
Nora Salinas, actress and model
Blanca Soto, actress, model and Miss Mexico World 1997
Daniel Suárez, NASCAR driver
Gloria Trevi, singer
Javier Treviño, former Deputy Foreign Minister of Mexico
Mariana Treviño, actress
Manuel Uribe, world's fattest man
Alicia Villarreal, singer
The Warning (Mexican band), consisting of sisters Daniela, Paulina, and Alejandra Villarreal
Kat Von D, tattoo artist
José Woldenberg, first President of the Federal Electoral Institute
Gabriel Zaid, writer, poet and intellectual
Lorenzo Zambrano, businessman and billionaire
Paulina Goto, actress and singer
Fabiola Guajardo, actress
Judith de los Santos (Malukah), singer, songwriter, composer

References

Redacción. (n.d.). Revelan ganadores de ""Mi historieta del agua"". Retrieved February 1, 2021, from https://abcnoticias.mx/revelan-ganadores-de-mi-historieta-del-agua/35059

 List
Monterrey